Shuangmiao Township is a township of Xiangcheng County in central Henan province, China, located about  northeast of the county seat and  southwest of downtown Xuchang. , it has 34 villages under its administration.

See also 
 List of township-level divisions of Henan

References 

Township-level divisions of Henan